David John Donaldson (born 12 November 1954) is an English former professional football right back who made 348 appearances in the Football League playing for Millwall and Cambridge United. He also played for the Los Angeles Skyhawks of the American Soccer League and for non-league club Royston Town, and was on the books of Arsenal without making a first-team appearance.

Career
Donaldson was born in Islington, London, and was an England schoolboy international before beginning his football career with Arsenal. He was a member of their 1971 FA Youth Cup-winning side, but never broke through to the first team. In June 1973, he transferred to Second Division club Millwall for £5,000. The team were relegated in 1975, and Donaldson helped them achieve promotion back to the Second Division in 1975–76, and made 258 appearances in all competitions over a six-and-a-half-year period. He acted as an emergency goalkeeper three times during his Millwall career. He spent the summer of 1979 with the Los Angeles Skyhawks of the American Soccer League, and on 5 February 1980, signed for Second Division Cambridge United for a fee of £50,000. He made 132 league appearances for Cambridge and was featured in a 2002 book, Cambridge United: 101 Golden Greats. In 1984, he moved on to Royston Town of the Isthmian League.

Personal life
After retiring from football, Donaldson ran a fish and chip shop and then worked for a food company as sales manager.

Honours
Arsenal
 FA Youth Cup: 1970–71
Millwall
 Football League Third Division promotion: 1975–76

References

1954 births
Living people
Footballers from Islington (district)
English footballers
England schools international footballers
Association football fullbacks
Arsenal F.C. players
Millwall F.C. players
Los Angeles Skyhawks players
Cambridge United F.C. players
Royston Town F.C. players
English Football League players
American Soccer League (1933–1983) players
English expatriate footballers
English expatriate sportspeople in the United States
Expatriate soccer players in the United States
Outfield association footballers who played in goal